During the 1923–24 English football season, Brentford competed in the Football League Third Division South and finished in 17th place.

Season summary

Third Division South club Brentford decided not to conduct an overhaul of its squad during the 1923 off-season. Goalkeeper and half backs William Young, Cyril Hunter, Bill Inglis and James Kerr were retained, as was outside forward Patsy Hendren. Up front, Bobby Hughes, Henry Parkinson and Harry Williams were signed to boost the team's strikeforce. Forwards Freddy Capper, Billy Clayson and Sidney Mulford were all retained, despite scoring just 11 goals between them during the 1922–23 season.

Aside from a six-match unbeaten run in November and December 1923, Brentford spent much of the 1923–24 season in the bottom four of the Third Division South. Three wins in the final four matches lifted the club to a 17th-place finish. Youngster Reginald Parker proved to be a revelation up front and became the first Brentford player to hit 20 goals in a season since the club entered the Football League in 1920. Billy Clayson also scored 10 goals, which meant Parker and Clayson accounted for 30 of the 45 goals the Bees scored during the season. Brentford failed to draw an away league match during the campaign, a joint-club record.

League table

Results
Brentford's goal tally listed first.

Legend

Football League Third Division South

FA Cup

 Sources: Statto, 100 Years of Brentford, The Complete History

Playing squad 
Players' ages are as of the opening day of the 1923–24 season.

 Sources: Timeless Bees, Football League Players' Records 1888 to 1939, 100 Years Of Brentford

Coaching staff

Statistics

Appearances and goals

Players listed in italics left the club mid-season.
Source: 100 Years of Brentford

Goalscorers 

Players listed in italics left the club mid-season.
Source: 100 Years of Brentford

Management

Summary

Transfers & loans 
Cricketers are not included in this list.

Notes

References 

Brentford F.C. seasons
Brentford